The sections and subsections of the genus Croton:

 sect. Cleodora (Klotzsch) Baill.
 sect. Cyclostigma Griseb.
 subsect. Cyclostigma (Griseb.) Müll. Arg.
 subsect. Sampatik G.L.Webster
 subsect. Palanostigma Mart. ex Baill.
 sect. Klotzschiphytum (Baill.) Baill.
 sect. Eutropia (Klotzsch) Baill.
 sect. Luntia (Raf.) G.L. Webster
 subsect. Cuneati G.L. Webster
 subsect. Matourenses G.L. Webster
 sect Eluteria Griseb.
 sect. Croton
 sect. Ocalia (Klotzsch) Baill.
 sect. Corylocroton G.L.Webster
 sect. Anadenocroton G.L.Webster
 sect. Tiglium (Klotzsch) Baill.
 sect. Quadrilobus Müll. Arg.
 sect. Cascarilla Griseb.
 sect. Velamea Baill.
 sect. Andrichnia Baill.
 sect. Anisophyllum Baill.
 sect. Furcaria Boivin ex Baill.
 sect. Monguia Baill.
 sect. Decapetalon Müll. Arg.
 sect. Podostachys (Klotzsch) Baill.
 sect. Octolobium Chodat & Hassl.
 sect. Geiseleria (Klotzsch) Baill.
 sect. Pilinophyton (Klotzsch) A. Gray
 sect. Eremocarpus (Benth.) G.L.Webster
 sect. Gynamblosis (Torr.) A. Gray
 sect. Crotonopsis (Michx.) G.L.Webster
 sect. Argyrocroton (Müll. Arg.) G.L.Webster
 sect. Lamprocroton (Müll. Arg.) Pax
 sect. Julocroton (Mart.) G.L.Webster
 sect. Adenophyllum Griseb.
 sect. Barhamia (Klotzsch) Baill.
 sect. Decalobium Müll. Arg.
 sect. Micranthis Baill.
 sect. Medea (Klotzsch) Baill.
 sect. Lasiogyne (Klotzsch) Baill.
 sect. Argyroglossum Baill.
 sect. Astraeopsis Baill.
 sect. Codonacalyx Klotzsch ex Baill.
 sect. Astraea (Klotzsch) Baill.
 sect. Drepadenium (Raf.) Müll. Arg.

Taxonomic lists
Plant sections